Jonathan St B. T. Evans (born 30 June 1948) is a British cognitive psychologist, currently Emeritus Professor of Psychology at the University of Plymouth. In 1975, with Peter Wason, Evans proposed one of the first dual-process theories of reasoning, an idea later developed and popularized by Daniel Kahneman. In a 2011 Festschrift, Evans' peers described him as "one of the most influential figures in the psychology of human reasoning".

Early life and career 

Evans began his academic career studying psychology (with a philosophy minor) at University College London in 1966, graduating in 1969 with a first-class honours degree. The same year, he began a Ph.D. on human inference titled "Deductive reasoning and linguistic usage (with special reference to negation)", supervised by Peter Cathcart Wason, which he completed in 1972. He published his first scientific paper, an early account of statistical data analysis by a computer program, in 1971. He spent the next three years at what is now London Metropolitan University.

In 1974, Evans relocated to  Plymouth University, where he has worked ever since. He became Professor of Cognitive Psychology in 1985, Director of the Centre for Thinking and Language in 1998, and Head of the School of Psychology in 2005. He became Emeritus Professor in 2009.

Research interests 

Evans has worked on all aspects of thinking and reasoning, but is best known for his work on dual-process theories of cognition, originally outlined in a 1975 paper titled "Dual Processes in Reasoning", co-authored with Peter Wason, and published in the journal Cognition. He is "widely considered the godfather of the standard dual process model that has come to dominate the field", an idea later popularized by Malcolm Gladwell, in Blink: The Power of Thinking Without Thinking, and Daniel Kahneman, in Thinking Fast and Slow. Evans' work combines experimental research and theoretical analysis and also covers human rationality, deductive reasoning, decision making and judgements, conditional reasoning, and the study of heuristics and biases.

Evans helped to establish the journal Thinking & Reasoning and was its editor from 1995 to 2011; he was a member of the editorial board of Psychological Review from 2009 to 2014.

Selected publications

Books

Collaborations

Articles

See also 
 Peter Cathcart Wason
 Dual process theory
 Reasoning

References

External links
 

1948 births
Living people
Alumni of University College London
Academics of the University of Plymouth
British psychologists
Cognitive psychologists